Luis Marquina (born 12 November 1952) is a Venezuelan footballer. He played in four matches for the Venezuela national football team in 1975. He was also part of Venezuela's squad for the 1975 Copa América tournament.

References

1952 births
Living people
Venezuelan footballers
Venezuela international footballers
Place of birth missing (living people)
Association football defenders
Portuguesa F.C. players